The Sandwich Man is a 1966 British comedy film directed by Robert Hartford-Davis and written by Hartford-Davis and Michael Bentine. The film also stars Bentine, with support from Dora Bryan, Harry H. Corbett, Bernard Cribbins, Diana Dors, Norman Wisdom, Terry-Thomas, Ian Hendry, and numerous other British character actors.

Plot synopsis
Bentine plays the lead role, that of Horace Quilby, a mild-mannered widower living in the London Docklands. His job as a sandwich-board man requires him to wander around London wearing immaculate morning dress (top hat and tails) and carrying advertisements. He is also secretary of the Sandwichmen's Brotherhood. However, his real interest in life is pigeon racing – especially his bird 'Esmerelda', which is racing from Bordeaux to London – so he keeps calling at places on his route to see if there is any news.

The action takes place on the streets of London. There is plenty of local colour: red London Transport RT buses are often in view, together with all manner of cars (from saloons and hansom cab taxis to chauffeur-driven Rolls-Royces) and vans.

During the course of one day, Quilby encounters a host of eccentric characters, who are played by an ensemble cast of Britain's best known comedy and character actors. The film is deliberately extremely episodic: one mildly amusing sequence follows another, with stars fleetingly appearing in a cameo role and sometimes just appearing in a background.

Quilby becomes involved in a series of capers:-
 There is an overloaded Mini Moke with a troubled scout leader behind the wheel but getting nowhere fast;
 Along comes a policeman riding a motorcycle who has had better days;
 The main story thread sees Quilby reunite Sue (Suzy Kendall), a young model, with her errant boyfriend Steven (David Buck).

Quilby's homing pigeon Esmerelda wins the race, and the whole of his neighbourhood joins in the celebrations.

Cast

 Michael Bentine as Horace Quilby, the Sandwich Man; also as Gungadin, the owner of a jazz club 
 Dora Bryan as Mrs. DeVere 
 Harry H. Corbett as Stage-Door Keeper 
 Bernard Cribbins as Photographer (Harold)
 Diana Dors as First Billingsgate Lady 
 Ian Hendry as Policeman on Motorbike 
 Stanley Holloway as Park Gardener 
 Wilfrid Hyde-White as Lord Uffingham 
 Michael Medwin as Sewer Man 
 Ron Moody as Rowing Coach 
 Anna Quayle as Second Billingsgate Lady 
 Terry-Thomas as Scoutmaster 
 Norman Wisdom as Boxing Vicar 
 Donald Wolfit as Car Salesman
 Suzy Kendall as Sue
 Alfie Bass as Model Yachtsman
 Fred Emney as Sir Mervyn Moleskin
 Sydney Tafler as First Fish Porter
 Frank Finlay as Second Fish Porter
 Warren Mitchell as Gypsy Sid
 David Buck as Steven Mansfield
 Tracey Crisp as Girl in the Black Plastic Mac 
 Earl Cameron as Bus Conductor
 Roger Delgado as Abdul, the carpet seller
 Leon Thau as Ram
 Hugh Futcher as Gogi
 Ronnie Stevens as Drunk
 Peter Jones as Escapologist (Manfred the Magnificent)
 John Le Mesurier as Senior Sandwich Man 
 Max Bacon as Chef
 John Junkin as Chauffeur
 Gerald Campion as Sandwich Man in Suit of Armour
 Burt Kwouk as Ice Cream Man
 David Lodge as Charlie
 Aubrey Morris as Cedric (The Great)
 Peter Arne as Gentleman in Rolls-Royce
 Jeremy Lloyd as Guardsman
 Michael Trubshawe as Guardsman
 Ewen Solon as Blind man
 Michael John Chaplin (Charlie's son) as the pavement/sidewalk artist
 Brian Cant Press photographer at East End street party
 Nosher Powell as Nosher, the bus driver
 Joe Gibbons as Man on Mowing Machine
 Deborah Bishop as Woman taking an unnatural interest in the size of Frank Finlay's sandwich

Production
The film was the second in a short-lived series of co-productions between the NFFC and Rank. Diana Dors had recently moved back to London after several years in the USA.

Reception
The film was poorly received at the time of its release, critically and commercially, but has since achieved some attention, especially for its backdrop of London in the Swinging Sixties.

References

Bibliography

External links 
 
 
  Reelstreets : https://www.reelstreets.com/films/sandwich-man-the/

1966 films
1966 comedy films
British comedy films
Films set in London
Films directed by Robert Hartford-Davis
1960s English-language films
1960s British films